Top Country Albums is a chart that ranks the top-performing country music albums in the United States, published by Billboard.  In 2013, 21 different albums topped the chart; placings were based on electronic point of sale data from retail outlets.

In the issue of Billboard dated January 5, Taylor Swift was at number one with Red, the album's ninth week at number one.  The album spent eight weeks in the top spot in 2013, but would prove to be Swift's last entry on the Top Country Albums chart, as she moved away from the country music genre with her subsequent releases.  With eight weeks atop the chart, Red tied with Here's to the Good Times, the debut album by Florida Georgia Line, for the most time spent at number one in 2013 by an album.  Luke Bryan, the only artist with more than one number one in 2013, had the highest total number of weeks at number one by an artist during the year: he spent two weeks in the peak position with Spring Break…Here to Party and seven with Crash My Party.  Both Bryan and Florida Georgia Line were associated with the so-called bro-country style, an emerging sub-genre which incorporated influences from rock music and hip hop and often featured lyrics relating to partying, attractive young women, and pick-up trucks.

In addition to Florida Georgia Line, several other acts reached number one for the first time in 2013.  In April, Kacey Musgraves and The Band Perry both gained their first chart-toppers with Same Trailer Different Park and Pioneer respectively,  and Hunter Hayes achieved the same feat in July with his eponymous album.  Hayes's album reached the top spot in its 89th week on the chart, the longest time taken for an album to reach number one since Billboard began using electronic sales data in 1991.  Cassadee Pope, the winner of the third season of TV singing contest The Voice late the previous year, gained her first number one album in October with Frame by Frame.  In December, the Robertson family from the TV show Duck Dynasty topped the chart with their debut album Duck the Halls: A Robertson Family Christmas.  It was displaced in the issue of Billboard dated December 14 by the compilation album Blame It All on My Roots: Five Decades of Influences by Garth Brooks, which entered the chart at number one.  Brooks's compilation was one of several of 2013's Top Country Albums number ones to also top the all-genre Billboard 200 chart, along with albums by Taylor Swift, Gary Allan, Luke Bryan, Kenny Chesney, Lady Antebellum and Keith Urban.

Chart history

See also
2013 in music
List of number-one country singles of 2013 (U.S.)

References

2013
United States Country Albums